Enterprise Football League started on January 13 and ended on April 14, 2008. Taiwan Power Company F.C. won the championship and would be compete in AFC President's Cup 2008. 
 The first season of Intercity Football League, founded by Chinese Taipei Football Association, was held from September 1 to December 9, 2008. Taipei City football team, represented by Tatung F.C., won the first league championship.

Events 
 November 30, 2007 - Asian Football Confederation decided to revoke Chinese Taipei's hosting right of 2008 AFC Challenge Cup because Taiwan failed to guarantee that it would meet the Asian governing body's standards for the 16-nation tournament.

League competitions

Enterprise Football League

Intercity Football League

Youth competitions

Highschool Football League

National Youth Cup

National High School Games

National teams

Men's national team 

Key
 (H) = Home match
 (A) = Away match
 EAC = East Asian Cup 2008 preliminary round
 WCQ = 2010 FIFA World Cup qualifying

Under-19 

Key
 AYCQ = AFC Youth Championship qualifying

References